Regal Princess may refer to one of the following ships:

 , in service with Princess Cruise Line between 1991 and 2007
 , commenced service with Princess Cruise Line in 2014

Ship names